The 1969–70 season was the 55th in the history of the Isthmian League, an English football competition.

Enfield were champions, winning the league for the third season in a row.

League table

References

Isthmian League seasons
I